During the 1990–91 English football season, Chelsea F.C. competed in the Football League First Division.

Season summary
In the 1990–91 season, the league campaign was proven to be a disappointment despite recruiting the club's first million pound players, Dennis Wise and Andy Townsend, as Chelsea finished 11th in the First Division and were knocked out of both cups by lower league opposition. As a result, Campbell was relieved of his duties at the end of the season and was appointed personal assistant to chairman Ken Bates.

Final league table

Results summary

Results by round

Results
Chelsea's score comes first

Legend

Football League First Division

FA Cup

League Cup

Full Members Cup

Squad

Transfers

In

Out

Transfers in:  £2,900,000
Transfers out:  £450,000
Total spending:  £2,450,000

References

Chelsea F.C. seasons
Chelsea